The WABA Championship is an international basketball tournament which takes place every year between national men's teams from West Asia. The tournament is also known as the West Asian Basketball Championship.

The tournament is organised by the West Asia Basketball Association, a subzone of the FIBA Asia. It serves as the West Asian qualifying tournament for the FIBA Asia Cup and FIBA Asia Challenge.

Summary

Medal table

Participating nations

References

External links 
 FIBA Asia official website

 
Basketball competitions in Asia between national teams